Rustam Tey Khan is a  1983 Pakistani action film, directed by Altaf Hussain, produced by Chaudhry Mohammad Ismail.The film starring Yousuf Khan Sultan Rahi, Anjuman, Mustafa Qureshi.

Cast

 Yousuf Khan
 Sultan Rahi
 Anjuman
 Zumurrud
 Mustafa Qureshi
 Nazli
 Nargis
 Bahar
 Ilyas Kashmiri
 Zahir Shah
 Azhar Khan
 Altaf Khan
 Nasrullah Butt
 Saleem Hasan
 Abid Kashmiri
 Munir Zarif
 Albela
 Haidar Abbas
 Gulzar

Guest appearances by
 Habib
 Talish

Film's track list
The music of  film Rustam Tey Khan (1983) is by musician M Ashraf. The lyrics are penned by Khawaja Pervez and the singer is Noor Jehan.

References

1983 films
Punjabi-language Pakistani films
Pakistani action films
Pakistani crime films
Pakistani musical films
1980s Punjabi-language films